Maureen O'Connor (born August 7, 1951) is an American lawyer and judge who served as the chief justice of the Ohio Supreme Court from 2011 to 2022. She was elected to the court in 2002, becoming chief justice in 2010.

Prior to this, O'Connor served as an associate justice of the Ohio Supreme Court and as the 61st lieutenant governor of Ohio, serving under Governor Bob Taft. She is a Republican.

Education and experience
O'Connor earned a bachelor's degree at Seton Hill University, Greensburg, Pennsylvania in 1973 and a Juris Doctor degree at the Cleveland State University College of Law in 1980. In 1981, O'Connor began practicing law in Summit County, Ohio. In 1985, she was appointed a magistrate of the Summit County Probate Court. She was then elected as a judge of the Summit County Court of Common Pleas, serving on the bench from 1993 to 1995. In 1994, she was elected to the office of Summit County prosecutor and served in that office from 1995 to 1999.  O'Connor received "The Cleveland State University Distinguished Alumnae Award for Civic Achievement" in 1997.

Service as Ohio Lieutenant Governor 
In 1998, O'Connor was elected Ohio's 61st lieutenant governor and served in that office from 1999 until she resigned at the end of 2002, under Governor Bob Taft.

Ohio Supreme Court tenure 
In 2002, O'Connor ran for and was elected to the Ohio Supreme Court, defeating Democrat Timothy Black. She began serving in 2003. She was reelected in 2008 with 67.14% of the vote against Democrat Joseph Russo. O'Connor defeated Chief Justice Eric Brown in the 2010 general election with 67.59% of the vote. Brown had been appointed chief justice by Gov. Ted Strickland in May 2010 after the death of Thomas J. Moyer. She is the sixth woman to have served as an Ohio Supreme Court justice and is the first woman to hold the post of chief justice. For the 2016 election, the Democratic Party did not field a candidate to run against O'Connor.

She has been described as an "independent voice" on the Ohio Supreme Court. She dissented on a ruling that upheld the forced closure of the last abortion clinic in Toledo, Ohio; she has expressed support for criminal justice reform; and called for less partisan influence in how judges are selected in Ohio.

In 2022, O'Connor was the deciding vote in a ruling that struck down a heavily pro-Republican gerrymandered redistricting map. She criticized how Republicans abused the redistricting process. After her vote, Ohio Republicans called for impeaching her.

See also

List of justices of the Ohio Supreme Court
List of Cleveland–Marshall College of Law alumni
List of female lieutenant governors in the United States

References

External links

|-

|-

|-

1951 births
Living people
20th-century American politicians
21st-century American judges
21st-century American women judges
American prosecutors
American women lawyers
Chief Justices of the Ohio Supreme Court
Cleveland–Marshall College of Law alumni
Lieutenant Governors of Ohio
Ohio Republicans
Justices of the Ohio Supreme Court
People from Washington, D.C.
Seton Hill University alumni
State cabinet secretaries of Ohio
Women chief justices of state supreme courts in the United States